Pedro Miguel Costa Seabra (born 11 November 1987) is a Portuguese former footballer who is last known to have played as a defender for Padroense.

Career

Seabra started his career with Portuguese third tier side Padroense. In 2009, Seabra signed for Leixões in the Portuguese top flight, where he made over 22 league appearances and scored 0 goals and suffered relegation to the Portuguese second tier. In 2011, Seabra returned to Portuguese third tier club Padroense, where he suffered relegation to the Portuguese fourth tier.

References

External links
 Pedro Seabra at playmakerstats.com

Living people
Portuguese footballers
Association football defenders
1987 births
Primeira Liga players
Padroense F.C. players
Leixões S.C. players